West Creek is a  tributary of Delaware Bay in Cape May County, New Jersey in the United States.

The name "West Creek" is derived from the Lenape word "westeconk," meaning "place of fat meat." It rises in the swamps to the west of Halberton, in Maurice River Township, and flows southward towards Belleplain State Forest. It was formerly dammed at Hoffman's Mill, but the pond is now drained. Southward, two dams still intact form Hands Millpond and Pickle Factory Pond. Below Pickle Factory Pond, it forms part of the boundary between Cape May and Cumberland Counties. It enters the tidal marshes, passing along the west side of the Stipson Island peninsula, near the south end of which is located an old landing, and empties into the bay.

Tributaries
 Watering Branch

See also
List of rivers of New Jersey

References

Rivers of Cape May County, New Jersey
Rivers of Cumberland County, New Jersey
Rivers of New Jersey
Tributaries of Delaware Bay